Kelnase is a village on Prangli Island in Viimsi Parish, Harju County in northern Estonia.

Keri island also belongs to Kelnase village.

References

 

Villages in Harju County